Hamamüstü is a village in the Gölyaka District of Düzce Province in Turkey. Its population is 522 (2022).

History 
In a village names list from the Ministry of Internal Affairs of the Republic of Turkey, dated 1928, it is referred to as "Hamamüstü Gürcüler".

References

Villages in Gölyaka District